Meshchera Lowlands (Meshchyora Lowlands), also referred to as simply Meshchera/Meshchyora, is a spacious lowland in the middle of the European Russia. It is named after the Finnic Meshchera people, which used to live there (later mixing with neighbouring Baltic and Slavic tribes). It occupies parts of Moscow Oblast, Vladimir Oblast and Ryazan Oblast; respectively, it is called the Moscow, Vladimir and Ryazan Meshcheras.

Geography
Meshchera is a plain of roughly triangular shape bounded by rivers Oka from the South, Moskva River from the Southwest, Klyazma from the North and Sudogda and Kolp/Kolpna (Колпь, Колпна) from the East. Elevation: 80–130 metres.

Climate of Meshchera is humid continental with long, cold and snowy winters, and short, warm and rainy summers.

It is covered by mixed forests, pine forests in sandy areas, with many wetlands  and lakes.

References

Geography of Russia
Geography of Vladimir Oblast
Geography of Moscow Oblast
Geography of Ryazan Oblast